Highway 348 (AR 348, Ark. 348, and Hwy. 348) is a designation for two east–west state highways in Crawford County. One segment of  runs from Highway 59 at Figure Five east to Arkansas Highway 60 near Rudy. A second segment of  runs from US Route 71 (US 71) at Cain east to National Forest Route 1007.

Route description

Figure Five to Rudy
AR 348 begins at US 71 at the unincorporated community of Cain south of Mountainburg. The route runs northeast, entering the Ozark National Forest and terminating at an intersection with National Forest Route 1007 and Hickory Street. The road is two–lane undivided for its entire length.

Cain to Ozark National Forest
The route begins at Highway 59 at the Figure Five community and runs east as a rural two-lane route. Winding through forested mountains, Highway 348 terminates at Highway 60 near Rudy.

History
Highway 348 was created by the Arkansas State Highway Commission on November 23, 1966. The second segment between Cain and the National Forest was designated on June 28, 1973 pursuant to Act 9 of 1973 by the Arkansas General Assembly.

Major intersections

See also

References

 
 

348
Transportation in Crawford County, Arkansas